Cooks Creek (also known as Cook Creek, Durham Creek, Schooks Creek, Scookes Creek, Scooks Creek, Squooks Creek) is a tributary of the Delaware River in Bucks County, Pennsylvania, in the United States, rising in Springfield Township and passing through Durham Township before emptying into the Pennsylvania Canal (Delaware Division) and the Delaware.

History
Cooks Creek was thought by historian Edward Mathews to have been named after Arthur Cooke, a landowner in the area (though not a resident) in this part of the county before 1700, but, there is doubt about this. In a deed executed on 10 February 1727 between Samuel Powell, Jeremiah Langhorne, and others of Philadelphia for tracts of land in Durham Township, the stream was referred to as Scooks Creek and the modern name may have been derived from that. The Creek was a major source of power for the Durham Mill and Furnace and a water supply to the Canal. In the 1940s, the creek was the only creek in Bucks County in which brook trout (Salvelinus fontinalis) was native. Knecht's Mill Covered Bridge was entered into the National Register of Historic Places on 1 December 1980 as reference number 80003432.

Statistics
Cooks Creek was entered into the Geographic Names Information System of the U.S. Geological Survey on 2 August 1979 as identification number 1172390. In the Pennsylvania Gazetteer of Streams, its identification number is 03295.

Course
Cooks Creek rises in Springfield Township just west of Richlandtown Pike about halfway between Coopersburg and Pleasant Valley flowing to the southeast until it passes under Pennsylvania Route 212 where it turns to the northeast until it reaches the western slope of Cressman Hill where it turns north until it runs by the eastern end of Springtown, then turns northeast. As it approaches the north slope of Mine Hill, it receives Hollow Run from the right bank. Then lastly, it skirts around the north slope of Rattlesnake Hill then empties into the Delaware Division of the Pennsylvania Canal, then finally into the Delaware River. Besides Hollow Run, it receives five tributaries from the left and three from the right.

Geology
Cooks Creek starts out on Flint Hill in the Quartz Fanglomerate laid down during the Jurassic and Triassic, consisting of Quartz conglomerate with round cobbles and boulders of quartzite, sandstone, quartz, and metarhyolite in red sand.

Then it passes through a region of Brunswick Formation, also formed during the Jurassic and Triassic, consisting of mudstone, siltstone, and shale. Mineralogy includes argillite and hornfel.

Later, it flows through a region of the Leithsville Formation, from the Cambrian, consisting of dolomite, calcareous shale, and chert.

In two places, it briefly touches beds of the Hardyston Quartzite formation, from the Canbrian, containing quartzite, feldspathic sandstone and has quartz-pebble conglomerate.

Finally, it lies upon a region of the Allentown Formation, from the Cambrian, which contains dolomite, limestone, chert, siltstone, and some oolites, stromatolites, and sharpstone conglomerate.

Crossings and Bridges

See also
List of rivers of Pennsylvania
List of rivers of the United States
List of Delaware River tributaries

References

Rivers of Bucks County, Pennsylvania
Rivers of Pennsylvania
Tributaries of the Delaware River